Paula McKenzie (born 4 July 1970) is a Canadian bobsledder. She competed in the two woman event at the 2002 Winter Olympics.

References

External links
 

1970 births
Living people
Canadian female bobsledders
Olympic bobsledders of Canada
Bobsledders at the 2002 Winter Olympics
Sportspeople from Calgary